An island is a land mass entirely surrounded by water.

The Island(s) may also refer to:

Places 

 Any of various islands around the world, see the list of islands
 The Island (Cache County, Utah), an island on the Bear River, Utah
 The Island, Chennai, a river island in India
 The Island, Chicago, a neighborhood of Chicago, Illinois, United States
 The Island, Croydon, a residential building in Croydon, England
 The Island, an enclave within Hilltop, Jersey City, New Jersey, United States
 The Island, Hythe End, an island on the River Thames in England
 The Island (Jefferson County, Oregon), a United States wilderness research area
 The Island, Trenton, New Jersey, a neighborhood in Mercer County, New Jersey, United States
 The Island, a neighborhood of Waltham, Massachusetts, United States
 The Island, Western Cape, in Great Brak River, South Africa
 The Islands, a defunct provincial electoral district in British Columbia
 The Islands, a region encompassing southern Florida and the Caribbean as defined in Joel Garreau's The Nine Nations of North America.

Books and publications

Fiction
 The Island (Benchley novel), 1979, by Peter Benchley
 The Island (Hislop novel), 2005, by Victoria Hislop
 L’ile, 1962, by Robert Merle, published in US as The Island (1964)

Poetry and plays
 The Island (Byron), an 1823 poem by Lord Byron
 The Island (play), 1973, by Athol Fugard, John Kani, and Winston Ntshona
 The Island (poem), 1944, an epic poem by Francis Brett Young

Periodicals
 The Island (Sri Lanka), a newspaper in Sri Lanka
 Die Insel, three German magazines

Music 
 Island (band), which represented Cyprus in the Eurovision Song Contest in 1981

Albums 
 The Island (album), by Johnny Mathis, 2017

Songs 
 "An Island" (Chevelle song), 2014
 "An Island", by Owen from The King of Whys, 2016
 "The Island" (Pendulum song), 2010
 "The Island" (Paul Brady song), 1985
 "The Island", by Ivan Lins and Vítor Martins

Transport 
 "The island", the superstructure of an aircraft carrier

Visual media

Film 
 The Island, the U.S. title of the 1960 Japanese film The Naked Island
 The Island (1934 film), a German film directed by Hans Steinhoff
 The Island (1979 film), an Argentine film directed by Alejandro Doria
 The Island (1980 film), a film directed by Michael Ritchie with Michael Caine based on Peter Benchley's novel of 1979
 The Island (2005 film), a science fiction film directed by Michael Bay
 The Island (2006 film) (Russian: Остров, or Ostrov), a 2006 film directed by Pavel Lungin
 The Island (2007 film), an Egyptian film directed by Sherif Arafa
 The Island (2011 film), a Bulgarian film directed by Kamen Kalev with Laetitia Casta
 The Island (2018 Chinese film), a Chinese comedy film directed by Huang Bo
 The Island (2018 Nigerian film), a 2018 Nigerian action film directed by Toka McBaror

Television 
 Al Jazeera, an Arabic TV station whose name translates in English as "The Island"
 The Island (Lost), the island of the show Lost, a character unto itself
 To Nisi, a Greek TV series, whose name translates in English as "The Island"
 The Island (American TV series), an American survival TV show with Bear Grylls, based on:
 The Island with Bear Grylls, a British survival TV show
 Real World/Road Rules Challenge: The Island, the 16th season of the Real World/Road Rules Challenge on MTV
  Ninjago: The Island , a miniseries of the Ninjago computer-animated television series

Video games 
 The Island (video game), a 1984 ZX Spectrum video game

Other uses 
 Island (disambiguation)
 Ecological island, a micro-habitat within a larger differing ecosystem
 Extraction island, in linguistics, phrases out of which extraction is impossible
 Island ECN, a network for stock trading, now part of Inet
 Islands (restaurant), a casual dining restaurant chain in the United States
 The Island, a Chicago radio program on WLRA
 Island Company, clothing brand
 Island-class patrol boat, class of the United States Coast Guard Cutters